James Lee Keltner (born April 27, 1942) is an American drummer and percussionist known primarily for his session work. He was characterized by Bob Dylan biographer Howard Sounes as "the leading session drummer in America".

Career
Keltner was inspired to start playing because of an interest in jazz, but the popularity of jazz was declining during the late 1950s and early 1960s, and it was the explosion of pop/rock in the mid-1960s that enabled him to break into recording work in Los Angeles. His first gig as a session musician was recording "She's Just My Style" for the pop group Gary Lewis and the Playboys.

Keltner's music career was hardly paying a living, and for several years at the outset he was supported by his wife. Toward the end of the 1960s, he finally began getting regular session work and eventually became one of the busiest drummers in Los Angeles. His earliest credited performances on record were with Gabor Szabo on the 1968 album Bacchanal.

In 1968, Keltner was also working in a music shop in Pasadena just down the street from the old Ice House coffeehouse when he was recruited to play drums in a "psychedelic" vocal group named "MC Squared" along with Michael Crowley, Michael Clough, Linda Carey—all from the folk group The Back Porch Majority)—and session guitarist/bassist Randy Cierley Sterling. They were signed by Mo Ostin and recorded an album for Warner/Reprise originally titled "MC Squared" which has later been re-mastered and re-released in 2012 with the album title "Tantalizing Colors." They appeared live that same year on the Hugh Hefner / Playboy Magazine television show Playboy After Dark playing two songs:  an original by MC Squared members Michael Clough and Michael Crowley titled "I Know You" and a version of the Fred Neil song Everybody's Talkin'.  Both Playboy After Dark performances with Keltner playing drums can currently be viewed on YouTube.

It was his work with Leon Russell playing on Delaney & Bonnie's Accept No Substitute that attracted the attention of Joe Cocker, who recruited Russell and everyone else he could out of the Delaney & Bonnie band for his  Mad Dogs & Englishmen tour. Playing with Joe Cocker led to work in 1970 and 1971, on records by Carly Simon (No Secrets), Barbra Streisand (Barbra Joan Streisand), Booker T. Jones (Booker T. & Priscilla), George Harrison (The Concert for Bangladesh) and John Lennon (Imagine).

Former Beatles
Keltner is well known for his session work on solo recordings by three members of the Beatles, working with George Harrison, John Lennon (including Lennon solo albums, as well as albums released both by the Plastic Ono Band and Yoko Ono), and Ringo Starr.

Keltner played on many key former Beatle solo releases, including Harrison's 1973 album Living in the Material World and Lennon's 1974 album Walls and Bridges. When Ringo Starr recorded his first full-fledged pop album, Ringo, Keltner was featured on several tracks. Following this, Keltner joined George Harrison on his 1974 tour of the United States.

In 1974 Keltner played on the Lennon-produced Harry Nilsson album Pussy Cats alongside Ringo (and Keith Moon) on "Rock Around the Clock". Keltner was featured on the Nilsson albums Son of Schmilsson with Harrison, Starr and Beatles associate Klaus Voormann as well as Duit on Mon Dei with Starr and Voormann.

Keltner's relationship with the former Beatles was such that in 1973 his name was used to mock Paul McCartney on albums released by Harrison and Starr. Early that year, McCartney, the only Beatle not to have worked with Keltner, included a note on the back cover of his Red Rose Speedway album, encouraging fans to join the "Wings Fun Club" by sending a "stamped addressed envelope" to an address in London. Later that year, both Harrison's Living in the Material World and Starr's Ringo contained a similar note encouraging fans to join the "Jim Keltner Fan Club" by sending a "stamped undressed elephant" to an address in Hollywood.

Keltner played the role of the judge in the music video for George Harrison's 1976 Top 30 hit, "This Song".

In 1989, Keltner toured with Ringo Starr & His All-Starr Band.

Equipment
Keltner is an endorser of DW drums, hardware and pedals, Ahead drumsticks/gloves/griptape, Paiste Cymbals, Remo drumheads and world percussion and Roland electronics.

Little Village
In 1987, Keltner, along with guitarist Ry Cooder and bassist Nick Lowe, played on John Hiatt's Bring the Family. Four years later the four musicians reunited as the band Little Village, recording an eponymous album.

Traveling Wilburys
Keltner played drums on both albums released by the 1980s supergroup the Traveling Wilburys, playing under the pseudonym "Buster Sidebury".

Ry Cooder
Keltner became Ry Cooder's go-to drummer, recording with him on many of his albums for over 40 years, including the following, as well as playing with him in Little Village.

Boomer's Story (1972)
Paradise and Lunch (1974)
Chicken Skin Music (1976)
Bop till You Drop (1979)
Borderline (1980)
The Slide Area (1982)
Get Rhythm (1987)
Chávez Ravine (2005)
My Name Is Buddy (2007)
I, Flathead (2008)
Pull Up Some Dust and Sit Down (2011)

List of artists
Keltner, as a freelance drummer, has worked with a long list of artists.

1970s
Jim Keltner recorded two albums with his band Attitudes for George Harrison's Dark Horse label. The band also included Danny Kortchmar, David Foster and Paul Stallworth, and recorded Attitudes in 1975 and Good News in 1977.

He is featured on Carly Simon's 1971 album, Anticipation.

He played on various tracks on Randy Newman's albums Sail Away and Little Criminals, including "You Can Leave Your Hat On", "Short People", and "Jolly Coppers On Parade".

He also played drums on the Bee Gees 1973 album Life in a Tin Can.

He played on 5 songs on Jackson Browne’s “For Everyman” album recorded in 1973 including the song “These Days.”

In 1973, he was the session drummer on Bob Dylan's Pat Garrett & Billy the Kid, which includes the hit "Knockin' on Heaven's Door". He described that session as "a monumental session for me because it was such a touching song, it was the first time I actually cried when I was playing".

In 1974, he played on most tracks on the Jack Bruce album Out of the Storm.

Other demonstrations of his style and range can be found in "Jealous Guy" on John Lennon's Imagine, the hit single "Dream Weaver" by Gary Wright, and "Watching the River Flow" by Bob Dylan.

Keltner is the drummer on the Steely Dan tune "Josie" (released in 1977). In the DVD "Steely Dan - Classic Albums: Aja", Donald Fagen states that in the bridge of the tune, Keltner overdubbed a 16th note based pattern played on a metal trash can lid.

Keltner is credited as the drummer on the 1979 album by Roy Clark and Gatemouth Brown, Makin' Music.

Keltner appears on Marc Jordan's 1979 album "Blue Desert" on tracks "Twilight" and "Lost in The Hurrah".

1980s
Keltner specialized in R&B, and developed a deceptively simple drumming style that melds a casual, loose feel with extraordinary precision. He is said to have influenced Jeff Porcaro and Danny Seraphine of Chicago.

Keltner played on the Saved and Shot of Love albums by Bob Dylan.

Keltner performed on many classic recordings by J. J. Cale and often worked with bassist Tim Drummond.

He played on most of the tracks on Roy Orbison's swansong Mystery Girl.

He played on four Richard Thompson albums: Daring Adventures (1986), Amnesia (1988), Rumor and Sigh (1991) and you? me? us? (1996).

Keltner played drums on the song "Now We're Getting Somewhere" from the hit album Crowded House (1986).

Also, he was a session drummer for the reunited Pink Floyd on the album A Momentary Lapse of Reason.

1990s
In the mid-1990s, Keltner joined the London Metropolitan Orchestra on its recording of "An American Symphony" on the movie soundtrack for Mr Holland's Opus.

In 1992, he played (together with Booker T. & the M.G.'s) at Bob Dylan's The 30th Anniversary Concert Celebration.

In 1993, he toured with Neil Young and Booker T. & the M.G.'s.

He played on Brian Wilson's 1995 album, I Just Wasn't Made for These Times.

He guested on Sheryl Crow's 1996 self-titled album, on the track "The Book".

He played on Gillian Welch's album Revival, on the track "The Only One and Only".

Keltner played on the 1997 Bill Frisell album Gone, Just Like a Train with Viktor Krauss and toured as a member of the trio in support of the album. He also played on the 1999 Frisell album Good Dog, Happy Man and is pictured in the CD leaflet and back cover (Nonesuch 79536-2).

2000s
In 2000, Keltner toured with Crosby, Stills, Nash & Young on their "Tour of America".

In 2000 he was the drummer on Neil Young's album Silver & Gold.

In 2000, Keltner collaborated with Charlie Watts, drummer of the Rolling Stones, on an instrumental album entitled The Charlie Watts–Jim Keltner Project.   Watts played drums for each track, while Keltner contributed sequenced sounds and percussion.  Tracks were named after famous drummers.

In 2002, he briefly joined Bob Dylan's band during the European gigs while its main drummer, George Receli, recuperated from a hand injury. Later in the year, Keltner played in Concert For George, a tribute to George Harrison a year following his death. Wearing a sweatshirt with a Bob Dylan logo, he reprised his role as the Wilburys' drummer, joining Tom Petty and Jeff Lynne for "Handle with Care." During that project and performance, he worked with Paul McCartney along with other percussionists, including Ringo Starr.

In 2003, he toured with Simon & Garfunkel in their Old Friends tour.

In 2004, he was one of the "Hot Licks" on Dan Hicks' Selected Shorts CD.

In 2006, he toured with T-Bone Burnett in The True False Identity tour and was featured on Jerry Lee Lewis's album Last Man Standing. He played on Mavis Staples's album We'll Never Turn Back, produced by Ry Cooder.

He also lent his drumming skills to the tracks on Richard Shapero's full-length album entitled Wild Animus: The Ram, recorded the same year.

In 2007, he appeared with Lucinda Williams on West. The album was listed No. 18 on Rolling Stones list of the Top 50 Albums of 2007.   He also played on Phish keyboardist's self titled debut album Page McConnell, released in 2007.

In 2008, Keltner appeared on Break up the Concrete by The Pretenders, on One Kind Favor by B. B. King and on Oasis's "The Boy with the Blues", a non-album-track from Dig Out Your Soul.

Also in 2008, Keltner participated in the production of the album Psalngs, the debut release of Canadian musician John Lefebvre.

In 2009, Keltner played drums on singer/songwriter Todd Snider's Don Was-produced album, The Excitement Plan.

2010s
In 2010, Keltner produced Jerry Lee Lewis's Mean Old Man duets CD. He played drums on Fistful of Mercy's debut album, As I Call You Down, which one of the band's members, Dhani Harrison, described in an interview as the first project of his that he felt worthy to bring to Keltner, who was an old family friend (Dhani is the son of George Harrison). Keltner also played on The Union by Leon Russell and Elton John, produced by T-Bone Burnett and released on October 10, 2010. He also appeared on the eponymous Eric Clapton album, on 8 of the 14 tracks.

Joseph Arthur's 2011 album, The Graduation Ceremony, features Keltner on drums, reprising a partnership that began with the Fistful of Mercy project.

He has recorded twice with the indie band She & Him, on 2011's A Very She & Him Christmas and 2014's Classics.

He played drums on Michael Buble’s 2011 “Christmas” album.  The tracks are “All I Want for Christmas is You,” and “Blue Christmas.”

For the 2012 release, Chimes of Freedom: The Songs of Bob Dylan Honoring 50 Years of Amnesty International, Keltner sat in a studio with Outernational covering Dylan's "When the Ship Comes In".

In 2012, he also played drums on John Mayer's "Something Like Olivia", the fifth track of the album Born and Raised.

That same year, he recorded with Italian instrumental band Sacri Cuori on their second record, Rosario.

In 2013, Keltner appears on the track "If I Were Me" from Sound City: Real to Reel with Dave Grohl, Jessy Greene and Rami Jaffee. Also, on "Our Love Is Here To Stay", a classic Gershwin jazz standard recorded by Eric Clapton for his album, Old Sock.

In 2014, Keltner played on Peter Himmelman's album The Boat That Carries Us.

In 2016, Keltner recorded drums for Neil Young's thirty-seventh studio album, Peace Trail.
In 2016, Keltner also appeared on the Rolling Stones' CD "Blue & Lonesome", playing percussion on "Hoo Doo Blues."

In 2017, Keltner played drums and percussion as well as co-producing Conor Oberst's Salutations album. Oberst described Keltner's production as "flawless".

In 2018, he played drums and percussion on Boz Scaggs' 19th album, Out of the Blues, and Eric Clapton's Happy Xmas.

In 2019, Keltner played drums along with bassist Mike Watt for guitarist Mike Baggetta's Wall of Flowers album  released in March. Keltner played drums on the original soundtrack for the movie "The Irishman". The music was written by Robbie Robertson.

Keltner plays drums on the song  included on Mike Viola's 2020 album The Best of Mike Viola. Manga artist Naoki Urasawa, who wrote the original song, also performs on it and drew a short manga of the experience for his "Musica Nostra" series that features Keltner.

 Collaborations With Cal Tjader Cal Tjader Sounds Out Burt Bacharach (Skye Records, 1968)With Conor Oberst Salutations (Nonesuch Records, 2017)With John Lennon Imagine (Apple Records, 1971)
 Mind Games (Apple Records, 1973)
 Walls and Bridges (Apple Records, 1974)
 Rock 'n' Roll (Apple Records, 1975)With Mick Jagger Wandering Spirit (Atlantic Records, 1993)
 Goddess in the Doorway (Virgin Records, 2001)With Nerina Pallot Fires (Idaho Records, 2005)With Dion DiMucci Born to Be with You (Phil Spector Records, 1975)With Patti Scialfa Rumble Doll (Columbia Records, 1993)With Debby Boone Surrender (Sparrow Records, 1983)With Livingston Taylor Three Way Mirror (Epic Records, 1978)With Lana Del Rey Did You Know That There's a Tunnel Under Ocean Blvd (Polydor Records, 2023)With Bruce Cockburn Nothing but a Burning Light (True North Records, 1991)With Gaby Moreno and Van Dyke Parks ¡Spangled! (Nonesuch Records, 2019)With J. D. Souther Black Rose (Asylum Records, 1976)With Keb' Mo' The Door (Epic Records, 2000)With Rob Thomas Cradlesong (Atlantic Records, 2009)
 Someday (Atlantic Records, 2010)With Patti Dahlstrom Your Place or Mine (20th Century Records, 1975)With Indigo Girls Nomads Indians Saints (Epic Records, 1990)With Robbie Robertson How to Become Clairvoyant (429 Records, 2011)
 Sinematic (UME, 2019)With Henry Gross Henry Gross (ABC Records, 1972)With Jessie Baylin Little Spark (Blonde Rat, 2012)With Kim Carnes Kim Carnes (A&M Records, 1975)With Carla Bruni French Touch (Barcklay Records, 2017)With Bob Bennett Non-Fiction (Star Song, 1985)With Neil Young Silver & Gold (Reprise Records, 2000)
 Peace Trail (Reprise Records, 2016)With Judy Collins Hard Times for Lovers (Elektra Records, 1979)With Bee Gees Life in a Tin Can (RSO Records, 1973)With Diana Krall Wallflower (Verve Records, 2015)With Delbert McClinton One of the Fortunate Few (Rising Tide, 1997)With Delaney & Bonnie The Original Delaney & Bonnie & Friends (Elektra Records, 1969)
 Motel Shot (Atco Records, 1971)With Ted Gärdestad Blue Virgin Isles (Polar, 1978)With Christina Courtin Christina Courtin (Nonesuch Records, 2009)With Michel Polnareff Michel Polnareff (Atlantic Records, 1975)With Gillian Welch Revival (Almo Sounds, 1996)With Steely Dan Aja (ABC Records, 1977)With Valdy Landscapes (Haida, 1973)
 See How the Years Have Gone By (A&M Records, 1975)With Lesley Gore Love Me By Name (A&M Records, 1976)With Joshua Radin Underwater (Mom + Pop Music, 2012)With Craig Doerge Craig Doerge (Columbia Records, 1973)With Melissa Etheridge Breakdown (Island Records, 1999)With Wayne Watson Field of Souls (Warner Alliance, 1995)With Shannon McNally Jukebox Sparrows (Capitol Records, 2002)With Donovan Slow Down World (Epic Records, 1976)
 Beat Cafe (Appleeseed Records, 2004)With Richie Furay Seasons of Change (Myrrh Records, 1982)With Dave Mason Alone Together (Blue Thumb Records, 1970)
 It's Like You Never Left (Blue Thumb Records, 1973)With Arlo Guthrie Hobo's Lullaby (Reprise Records, 1972)
 Last of the Brooklyn Cowboys (Reprise Records, 1973)
 Arlo Guthrie (Reprise Records, 1974)With Jenny Lewis On the Line (Warner Bros. Records, 2019)With Lindsey Buckingham and Stevie Nicks  
 Buckingham Nicks (Polydor, 1973)With Céline Dion Taking Chances (Columbia Records, 2007)With Barbara Keith Barbara Keith (Reprise Records, 1973)With Eye to Eye Eye to Eye (Warner Bros. Records, 1982)With Jill Sobule California Years (Pinko Records, 2009)With Willis Alan Ramsey Willis Alan Ramsey (Shelter Records, 1972)With Carlene Carter I Fell in Love (Reprise Records, 1990)
 Carter Girl (Rounder Records, 2014)With The Manhattan Transfer Coming Out (Atlantic Records, 1976)With Melody Gardot The Absence (Decca Records, 2012)With Frank Black Fast Man Raider Man (Cooking Vinyl, 2006)With Joseph Arthur Come to Where I'm From (Virgin Records, 2000)
 The Graduation Ceremony (Lonely Astronaut Records, 2011)
 The Ballad of Boogie Christ (Lonely Astronauct Records, 2013)With Steve Miller Band Recall the Beginning...A Journey from Eden (Capitol Records, 1972)With Smokey Robinson Smokey & Friends (Verve Records, 2014)With John Lee Hooker Mr. Lucky (Virgin Records, 1991)With Delaney Bramlett Sounds From Home (Zane, 1998)With Johnny Rivers Home Grown (United Artists Records, 1970)
 Outside Help (Big Tree Records, 1977)
 Not a Through Street (CBS, 1983)With Joe Henry Tiny Voices (Anti-, 2003)With Lonnie Mack Second Sight (Alligator Records, 1986)With Lowell George Thanks, I'll Eat It Here (Warner Bros. Records, 1979)With Mavis Staples We'll Never Turn Back (Anti-, 2007)With Tanita Tikaram Lovers in the City (East West Records, 1995)With Beth Nielsen Chapman Sand and Water (Reprise Records, 1997)With Phoebe Bridgers Punisher (Dead Oceans, 2020)With Rosie Vela Zazu (A&M Records, 1986)With Rhett Miller The Instigator (Elektra Records, 2002)With Howdy Moon Howdy Moon (A&M Records, 1974)With Marshall Crenshaw Jaggedland (429 Records, 2009)With Kiki Dee Stay With Me (Rocket, 1978)With Diana DeGarmo Blue Skies (RCA Records, 2004)With George Harrison Living in the Material World (Apple Records, 1973)
 Dark Horse (Apple Records, 1974)
 Extra Texture (Read All About It) (Apple Records, 1975)
 Somewhere in England (Dark Horse Records, 1981)
 Gone Troppo (Dark Horse Records, 1982)
 Cloud Nine (Dark Horse Records, 1987)
 Brainwashed (Dark Horse Records, 2002)With The Pretenders Break Up the Concrete (Shangri-La Music, 2008)With Karen Alexander Voyager (Elektra Records, 1978)With Gaby Moreno Alegoría (Metamorfosis, 2022)With A. J. Croce A. J. Croce (Private Music, 1993)
 That's Me in the Bar (Private Music, 1995)With Bonnie Raitt Takin' My Time (Warner Bros. Records, 1973)With Cracker Cracker (Virgin Records, 1992)With John Mayer Born and Raised (Columbia Records, 2012)
 The Search for Everything (Columbia Records, 2017)With Chris Isaak Silvertone (Warner Bros. Records, 1985)
 San Francisco Days (Reprise Records, 1993)With Clarence "Gatemouth" Brown Makin' Music (MCA Records, 1978)
 Long Way Home (Verve Records, 1995)With Melissa Manchester Don't Cry Out Loud (Arista Records, 1978)With Tom Petty and the Heartbreakers Damn the Torpedoes (MCA Records, 1979)
 Southern Accents (MCA Records, 1985)With Keith Carradine Lost & Found (Asylum Records, 1979)With Beth Orton Daybreaker (Heavenly Records, 2002)With Matthew Sweet In Reverse (Volcano, 1999)With Denny Doherty Waiting for a Song (Ember Records, 1974)With Peter Allen Taught by Experts (A&M Records, 1976)With Joe Cocker Joe Cocker (A&M Records, 1972)
 Civilized Man (Capitol Records, 1984)
 Night Calls (Capitol Records, 1991)
 Organic (550 Music, 1996)
 Hymn for My Soul (EMI, 2007)With Albert King Lovejoy (Stax Records, 1971)With Shawn Colvin Fat City (Columbia Records, 1992)
 Cover Girl (Columbia Records, 1994)With Ringo Starr Ringo (Apple Records, 1973)
 Goodnight Vienna (Apple Records, 1974)
 Ringo's Rotogravure (Polydor Records, 1976)
 Stop and Smell the Roses (RCA Records, 1981)With Alison Krauss Forget About It (Rounder Records, 1999)With Linda Ronstadt Feels Like Home (Elektra Records, 1995)
 We Ran (Elektra Records, 1998)With Michelle Branch Everything Comes and Goes (Reprise Records, 2010)With Rickie Lee Jones Flying Cowboys (Geffen, 1989)
 Traffic from Paradise (Geffen, 1993)With Richard Thompson Daring Adventures (Polydor Records, 1986)
 Amnesia (Capitol Records, 1988)
 Rumor and Sigh (Capitol Records, 1991)
 You? Me? Us? (Capitol Records, 1996)With B.B. King B.B. King in London (ABC Records, 1971)
 There Is Always One More Time (MCA Records, 1991)
 Deuces Wild (MCA Records, 1997)
 One Kind Favor (Geffen, 2008)With Dan Fogelberg Twin Sons of Different Mothers (Epic Records, 1978)With Brian Wilson I Just Wasn't Made for These Times (MCA Records, 1995)
 No Pier Pressure (Capitol Records, 2015)With Seals and Crofts Summer Breeze (Warner Bros. Records, 1972)
 Takin' It Easy (Warner Bros. Records, 1978)With Don Henley Building the Perfect Beast (Geffen, 1984)
 The End of the Innocence (Geffen, 1989)With Warren Zevon Mr. Bad Example (Giant, 1991)
 The Wind (Artemis Records, 2003)With Marc Cohn The Rainy Season (Atlantic Records, 1993)
 Join the Parade (Decca Records, 2007)With Marc Benno Minnows (A&M Records, 1971)
 Ambush (A&M Records, 1972)
 Lost in Austin (A&M Records, 1979)With Lauren Wood Lauren Wood (Capitol Records, 1979)With Elton John and Leon Russell The Union (Mercury Records, 2010)With Yoko Ono Fly (Apple Records, 1971)
 Feeling the Space (Apple Records, 1973)With Curtis Stigers Brighter Days (Columbia Records, 1999)With Jackson Browne For Everyman (Asylum Records, 1973)
 Lives in the Balance (Asylum Records, 1986)
 I'm Alive (Elektra Records, 1993)
 Standing in the Breach (Inside Recordings, 2014)With Aaron Neville Warm Your Heart (A&M Records, 1991)With Maria Muldaur Maria Muldaur (Reprise Records, 1973)With Bill Withers Just as I Am (Sussex Records, 1971)With Colin James Limelight (MapleMusic Recordings, 2005)With Roy Orbison Mystery Girl (Virgin Records, 1989)
 King of Hearts (Virgin Records, 1992)With Van Dyke Parks Clang of the Yankee Reaper (Warner Bros. Records, 1976)
 Jump! (Warner Bros. Records, 1984)With Christine Lakeland Reckoning (Virgin Records, 1993)With Michael Penn March (RCA Records, 1989)
 Free-for-All (RCA Records, 1992)With Adam Cohen Adam Cohen (Columbia Records, 1998)With Freddie King Woman Across the River (Shelter Records, 1973)With Boz Scaggs Come On Home (Virgin Records, 1997)
 Out of the Blues (Concord Records, 2018)With Shivaree I Oughtta Give You a Shot in the Head for Making Me Live in This Dump (Capitol Records, 1999)With Bob Dylan Saved (Columbia Records, 1980)
 Shot of Love (Columbia Records, 1981)
 Empire Burlesque (Columbia Records, 1985)
 Time Out of Mind (Columbia Records, 1997)With Jann Arden Time for Mercy (A&M Records, 1993)
 Happy? (A&M Records, 1997)With Tonio K. Notes from the Lost Civilization (A&M Records, 1988)With Bill Wyman Stone Alone (Atlantic Records, 1976)With Tim Easton Break Your Mother's Heart (New West Records, 2003)With Tom Petty Full Moon Fever (MCA Records, 1989)With Don Everly Don Everly (Ode Records, 1970)With Pops Staples Peace to the Neighborhood (Pointblack Records, 1992)
 Father Father (Pointblack Records, 1994)With Sam Phillips Omnipop (It's Only a Flesh Wound Lambchop) (Virgin Records, 1996)
 Fan Dance (Nonesuch Records, 2001)
 A Boot and a Shoe (Nonesuch Records, 2004)With Fiona Apple When the Pawn... (Epic Records, 1999)
 Extraordinary Machine (Epic Records, 2005)With Pat McLaughlin Pat McLaughlin (Capitol Records, 1988)With Susanna Hoffs Susanna Hoffs (London Records, 1996)With Neil Finn One Nil (Parlophone Records, 2001)With Carly Simon No Secrets (Elektra Records, 1972)
 Hotcakes (Elektra Records, 1974)
 Another Passenger (Elektra Records, 1976)
 Christmas Is Almost Here (Rhino Records, 2002)
 Christmas Is Almost Here Again (Rhino Records, 2003)With Priscilla Coolidge and Booker T. Jones Booker T. & Priscilla (A&M Records, 1971)
 Chronicles (A&M Records, 1973)With Ryan Adams Gold (Lost Highway Records, 2001)With Vonda Shepard The Radical Light (Reprise Records, 1992)With Ron Davies Silent Song Through the Land (A&M Records, 1970)With Emmylou Harris, Dolly Parton and Linda Ronstadt Trio II (Asylum Records, 1999)With William Lee Golden American Vagabond (MCA Records, 1986)With Rufus Wainwright Rufus Wainwright (DreamWorks Records, 1998)
 Poses (Dreamworks Records, 2001)
 Unfollow the Rules (BMG, 2020)With Pink Floyd A Momentary Lapse of Reason (Columbia Records, 1987)With Matraca Berg The Speed of Grace (MCA Records, 1994)With Crowded House Crowded House (Capitol Records, 1986)With Aimee Mann Whatever (Geffen, 1993)With Neil Diamond Beautiful Noise (Columbia Records, 1976)
 Heartlight (Columbia Records, 1982)With Pat McLaughlin Pat McLaughlin (Capitol Records, 1988)With Loudon Wainwright III Unrequited (Columbia Records, 1975)
 Here Come the Choppers (Sovereign Records, 2005)With Randy Newman Sail Away (Reprise Records, 1972)
 Good Old Boys (Reprise Records, 1974)
 Little Criminals (Reprise Records, 1977)
 Randy Newman's Faust (Reprise Records, 1995)With Jimmy Cliff Follow My Mind (Reprise Records, 1975)
 Give Thankx (Warner Bros. Records, 1978)With Perfume Genius Set My Heart on Fire Immediately (Matador Records, 2020)With Joni Mitchell Turbulent Indigo (Reprise Records, 1994)With José Feliciano And the Feeling's Good (RCA Victor, 1974)
 For My Love... Mother Music (RCA Victor, 1974)With Chris Stills 100 Year Thing (Atlantic Records, 1998)With Eric Clapton Journeyman (Reprise Records, 1989)
 From the Cradle (Warner Bros. Records, 1994)
 Me and Mr. Johnson (Reprise Records, 2004)
 Clapton (Reprise Records, 2010)
 Old Sock (Polydor Records, 2013) 
 Happy Xmas (Polydor Records, 2018)With Ted Hawkins The Next Hundred Years (DGC, 1994)With Janice Robinson The Color Within Me (Columbia Records, 1999)With Tonio K. Note from the Lost Civilization (A&M Records, 1988)With Sara Bareilles Amidst the Chaos (Epic Records, 2019)With David Pomeranz It's in Every One of Us (Arista Records, 1975)With Claudia Lennear Phew! (Warner Bros. Records, 1973)With Hanne Boel Dark Passion (Medley Records, 1990)With Michael Des Barres Somebody Up There Likes Me (MCA Records, 1986)With Jude Cole Start the Car (Reprise Records, 1992)With Toto Fahrenheit (Columbia Records, 1986)
 The Seventh One (Columbia Records, 1988)
 Kingdom of Desire (Relativity Records, 1992)With Ry Cooder Boomer's Story (Reprise Records, 1972)
 Paradise and Lunch (Reprise Records, 1974)
 Chicken Skin Music (Reprise Records, 1976)
 Bop till You Drop (Warner Bros. Records, 1979)
 Borderline (Warner Bros. Records, 1980)
 The Slide Area (Warner Bros. Records, 1982)
 Get Rhythm (Warner Bros. Records, 1987)
 Chávez Ravine (Nonesuch Records, 2005)
 My Name Is Buddy (Nonesuch Records, 2007)
 I, Flathead (Nonesuch Records, 2008)
 Pull Up Some Dust and Sit Down (Nonesuch Records, 2011)With Ziggy Marley and the Melody Makers Spirit of Music (Elektra Records, 1999)With Don Felder American Rock 'n' Roll (BMG, 2019)With Hoyt Axton'''
 Life Machine (A&M Records, 1974)
 Fearless (A&M Records, 1976)
 Free Sailin (MCA Records, 1978)With Murray Attaway In Thrall (Geffen, 1993)With Cher Stars (Warner Bros. Records, 1975)With Leon Russell Leon Russell and the Shelter People (Shelter Records, 1971)
 Carney (Shelter Records, 1972)
 Stop All That Jazz (Shelter Records, 1974)
 Will O' the Wisp (Shelter Records, 1975)With Leonard Cohen Death of a Ladies' Man (Warner Bros. Records, 1977)With Ivan Neville If My Ancestors Could See Me Now (Polydor Records, 1988)With Toni Childs House of Hope (A&M Records, 1991)With Martha Reeves Martha Reeves (MCA Records, 1974)With Nick Lowe Party of One (Reprise Records, 1990)With Tom Pacheco The Outsider (RCA Victor, 1976)With Sheryl Crow Sheryl Crow (A&M Records, 1996)With Frankie Valli Closeup (Private Stock Records, 1975)With David Crosby Oh Yes I Can (A&M Records, 1989)
 Thousand Roads (Atlantic Records, 1993)With Bette Midler Broken Blossom (Atlantic Records, 1977)
 No Frills (Atlantic Records, 1983)With Maria McKee Maria McKee (Geffen, 1989)
 You Gotta Sin to Get Saved (Geffen, 1993)With Tom Johnston Everything You've Heard Is True (Warner Bros. Records, 1979)With Rod Stewart Vagabond Heart (Warner Bros. Records, 1991)With Rita Coolidge Rita Coolidge (A&M Records, 1971)
 The Lady's Not for Sale (A&M Records, 1972)
 Satisfied (A&M Records, 1979)With Willie Nelson Across the Borderline (Columbia Records, 1993)With Thelma Houston I've Got the Music in Me (Sheffeld Lab, 1975)With Harry Nilsson Nilsson Schmilsson (RCA Victor, 1971)
 Pussy Cats (RCA Victor, 1974)
 Duit on Mon Dei (RCA Victor, 1975)
 Sandman (RCA Victor, 1976)
 ...That's the Way It Is (RCA Victor, 1976)
 Flash Harry (Mercury Records, 1980)With Syd Straw Surprise (Virgin Records, 1989)With Michael Bublé Christmas (Reprise Records, 2011)
 To Be Loved (Reprise Records, 2013)
 Higher (Reprise Records, 2022)With Crosby, Stills, Nash & Young Looking Forward (Reprise Records, 1999)With Roberta Flack I'm the One (Atlantic Records, 1982)With Rodney Crowell Ain't Living Long Like This (Warner Bros. Records, 1978)With Barbra Streisand Barbra Joan Streisand (Columbia Records, 1971)With Irene Cara Carasmatic (Elektra Records, 1987)With Ronnie Wood Gimme Some Neck (Columbia Records, 1979)
 1234 (Columbia Records, 1981)
 I Feel Like Playing (Eagle Rock Entertainment, 2010)With Peabo Bryson and Roberta Flack Born to Love (Capitol Records, 1983)With Art Garfunkel Breakaway (Columbia Records, 1975)With Elvis Costello King of America (F-Beat Records, 1986)
 Spike (Warner Bros. Records, 1989)
 Mighty Like a Rose (Warner Bros. Records, 1991)
 Kojak Variety (Warner Bros. Records, 1995)
 Painted from Memory (Mercury Records, 1998)With J. J. Cale Shades (Island Records, 1981)
 8 (Mercury Records, 1983)
 Travel-Log (BMG, 1990)
 Closer to You (Virgin Records, 1994)
 Roll On (Rounder Records, 2009)With James Taylor Gorilla (Warner Bros. Records, 1975)
 In the Pocket (Warner Bros. Records, 1976)With Terry Evans Blues for Thought (Point Blank Records, 1994)
 Puttin' In Down (AudioQuest Music, 1995)
 Walk That Walk (Telark Records, 2000)With Yvonne Elliman Night Flight (RSO Records, 1978)
 Yvonne (RSO Records, 1979)With Les Dudek Ghost Town Parade (Columbia Records, 1978)With Dolly Parton Here You Come Again (RCA Records, 1977)
 Great Balls of Fire (RCA Records, 1979)
 Rainbow (Mercury Records, 1987)With Carole Bayer Sager' Carole Bayer Sager (Elektra Records, 1977)
 ...Too (Elektra Records, 1978)
 Sometimes Late at Night (The Broadwark Entertainment, 1981)

References

External links
2015 Audio Interview with Jim Keltner from the I'd Hit That podcast October 2015*
"Jim Keltner on Booker T. and the MGs"(2007 Variety article by Jim Keltner)
2005 Interview by Modern Drummer'' magazine
Jim Keltner Billboard biography

1942 births
Living people
Musicians from Tulsa, Oklahoma
American rock drummers
American session musicians
American people of German descent
Bob Dylan
Delaney & Bonnie & Friends members
Plastic Ono Band members
Steve Miller Band members
20th-century American drummers
20th-century British male musicians
American male drummers
21st-century American drummers
21st-century American male musicians
Ringo Starr & His All-Starr Band members